This is a list of seafood companies. Seafood is any form of sea life regarded as food by humans. Seafood prominently includes fish and shellfish. Seafood companies are typically involved with fishing, fish processing, distribution and marketing. Seafood companies also produce feed and nutrition products for farmed fish.

Seafood companies

Australia
Clean Seas Seafood
Huon Aquaculture
Seafish Tasmania
Tassal

Greenland

 Royal Greenland

Hong Kong
 Pacific Andes

Norway

 Aker BioMarine 
 Domstein 
 EWOS 
 GC Rieber 
 Grieg Seafood 
 Havfisk 
 Lerøy 
 SalMar
 Marine Farms 
 Mowi 
 Nergård AS 
 Norges Sildesalgslag 
 Norway Pelagic 
 Rauma Group 
 Rem Offshore 
 Stolt-Nielsen 
 Volden Group

Sweden
 Abba Seafood

Thailand
 Thai Union Group

United Kingdom
 John West Foods
 Pescanova
 Ross Group
 Shippam's
 Whitby Seafoods Ltd
 Young's Bluecrest

United States

 American Seafoods
 Anna Maria Fish Co.
 Bumble Bee Foods
 Pacific Seafood
 Phillips Foods, Inc. and Seafood Restaurants
 Punta Gorda Fish Co.
 Trident Seafoods

Philippines
 Akai Foods, Inc.

Vietnam
 Cuulong Fish

See also

 Commercial fishing
 Fish market
 List of canneries
 List of fish dishes
 List of seafood restaurants
 List of seafood dishes
 List of types of seafood
 Salmon cannery

References

 
Seafood